Alevtina Vasilyevna Fedulova (born 14 April 1940) is a Russian political activist and former leader of the Soviet Women's Committee (later the Union of Women of Russia).

Early life 
Fedulova was born on 14 April 1940, in Elektrostal, to an illiterate, yet intelligent, mother and a blacksmith father, who died when she was young. An excellent student, Fedulova wished to become a teacher as a child, but went to a local technical school linked to a local factory. Under pressure, Fedulova's mother paid the tuition to allow her to finish at the school, enabling her to take entrance exams in Moscow for a teacher training institute there.

Fedulova married at age 20, while still studying at the institute, in 1960. Her husband was conscripted to military service around the time their son was born. Upon graduation, she became a teacher of biology and chemistry. She remained as a high school teacher for ten years.

Political career 
In 1963, Fedulova joined the Communist Party of the Soviet Union, about which she expressed some ambivalence.

Fedulova later became head of the Pioneers and was the executive secretary of the Soviet Peace Committee. In 1987, she left her position to work for the Soviet Women's Committee full-time, and was elected vice-president of the organisation that same year. From 1981 until 1986, she was a member of the CPSU's Auditing Commission, and was promoted to the Central Committee in 1990.

After the dissolution of the Soviet Union, Fedulova's position of power within the CPSU made many feminists sceptical. However, as leader of the Women of Russia bloc in 1993, but not affiliated to any political party in particular, she became a member of the Duma. This resulted in 8% of the Duma belonging to the Women of Russia bloc, allowing them to form their own official faction within the Russian government.

Personal life
Fedulova is married to her husband, a former deputy sports minister, and has one son and two grandchildren.

References

Living people
Russian feminists
Russian women's rights activists
1940 births
First convocation members of the State Duma (Russian Federation)
20th-century Russian women politicians